Memunatu Sulemana  (born 4 November 1977) is a Ghanaian former footballer who played as a goalkeeper. She has been a member of the Ghana women's national team.

Club career
On club level Sulemana played for Post Ladies in Ghana. She previously played for Pelican Stars in Nigeria Women Premier League.

International career
Sulemana was part of the Ghana women's national football team at the 1999 FIFA Women's World Cup, 2003 FIFA Women's World Cup and 2007 FIFA Women's World Cup.

References

1977 births
Living people
Ghanaian women's footballers
Ghana women's international footballers
Place of birth missing (living people)
1999 FIFA Women's World Cup players
2003 FIFA Women's World Cup players
2007 FIFA Women's World Cup players
Women's association football goalkeepers
Expatriate footballers in Nigeria Women Premier League